Nygel "Nigel" Jonathan Spivey (born 17 October 1958) is a British classicist and academic, specialising in classical art and archaeology. He is a senior lecturer in classics at the University of Cambridge and a fellow of Emmanuel College. He has written extensively on the Etruscans and on the Olympic Games.

As an undergraduate, he was a three-time champion at the Oxford-Cambridge athletics match and he remains an active member of the Achilles Club, an Oxbridge sports organization.

TV
He has presented various television series:

 For BBC: How Art Made the World, 2005
 For ITV: Digging for Jesus, 2005
 For Channel 5: Kings and Queens, and Heroes of World War II.
For BBC: “Cunk on Earth”, Season 1 Episode 2, 2022.

Published works
 Understanding Greek Sculpture
 Etruscan Art (1997)
 Greek Art & Ideas (1997)
Enduring Creation: Art, Pain, and Fortitude (2001)
 Panorama of the Classical World (With Michael Squire) (2004)
 The Ancient Olympics: War minus the shooting (2004)
 Songs On Bronze: The Greek Myths Made Real (2005)
 Greek Sculpture (2013), an "entire renovation" of Understanding Greek Sculpture.

Tours
He leads archaeological tours for Peter Sommer Travels.

References

External links
 Cambridge Contact Page
 Public Speaking Contact Page

British classical scholars
Classical archaeologists
Alumni of Emmanuel College, Cambridge
Fellows of Emmanuel College, Cambridge
Members of the University of Cambridge faculty of classics
1958 births
Living people